Isaac Lobe Straus (March 24, 1871 – February 4, 1946) was an American politician and lawyer from Maryland. He served in the Maryland House of Delegates in 1902 and as Attorney General of Maryland from 1907 to 1911.

Early life
Isaac Lobe Straus was born on March 24, 1871, in Baltimore, Maryland, to Annette (née Lobe) and William Henry Straus. He attended Baltimore City College and graduated from Johns Hopkins University in 1890. He was Jewish. He graduated from the University of Maryland School of Law in 1892 with a Bachelor of Laws. He was admitted to the bar in June 1892.

Career
Straus served as general counsel to the Board of Supervisors of Elections for Baltimore from 1900 to 1901. He was a member of the burnt district commission following the Great Baltimore Fire. He served as special counsel for the state of Maryland relating to the Baltimore and Ohio Railroad.

Straus was a Democrat. Straus served in the Maryland House of Delegates, representing Baltimore, in 1902. He served as Attorney General of Maryland from 1907 to 1911. He served as a delegate to the 1908 Democratic National Convention. He was an unsuccessful candidate for the United States Senate in 1914.

Personal life
Straus married Florence Ridgely.

Straus died on February 4, 1946, in Brooklandville, Maryland. He was buried at Har Sinai Cemetery in Baltimore.

References

External links

1871 births
1946 deaths
American Jews
Burials at Har Sinai Cemetery
Politicians from Baltimore
Johns Hopkins University alumni
University of Maryland Francis King Carey School of Law alumni
Democratic Party members of the Maryland House of Delegates
Maryland Attorneys General